The Pollock Medal is a prize awarded to the best cadet of the season, in commemoration of Sir George Pollock's exploits in Afghanistan, first at the East India Company's Military Seminary at Addiscombe, and later at the Royal Military Academy, Woolwich.

Foundation 
In 1844, the British inhabitants of Calcutta raised a subscription of 11,000 rupees to commemorate General George Pollock's victories in Afghanistan after the disastrous retreat of the British army of occupation from Kabul in January 1842.  This was to consist of a medal to be presented twice a year “to the most distinguished cadet at the East India Company’s Military Seminary, at Addiscombe, near Croydon in England, on passing the biennial examination for a commission.”

Description 

The original medal, with a weight of 2oz and valued at sixteen guineas, was designed by General Macleod and was first presented in December 1847, with the following inscription:

To commemorate eminent services

Major-General Sir George Pollock, K.C.B.

Bengal Artillery, Cabul 1842

Treachery avenged – British honour vindicated – Disasters retrieved – British captives delivered – Khyber Pass forced – Jellalabad relieved – Victories of Mamoo Khail, Jugdulluck, Tezeen, Istaliff

And on the reverse:

Military Seminary, Addiscombe

Pollock Prize

Presented by the British Inhabitants of Calcutta, and Awarded by the Court of Directors of the East India Company, to the most distinguished Cadet of the Season.

Changes 
In 1861, the Secretary of State for India, who was now responsible for the management of Indian affairs after the British government had taken India over from the East India Company, decided to have a new medal of a smaller size. The medal was valued at twelve guineas, and part of the inscription recording the services of Sir George Pollock and his army was omitted.

The new version continued to have the portrait of Sir George Pollock but with the inscription:

Pollock, Cabul, 1842

And on its reverse:

Pollock Prize, Royal Military Academy

Founded by the British inhabitants of Calcutta to commemorate the eminent services of Major-General Sir George Pollock, G.C.B., and awarded to the most distinguished Cadet of the season
 
Although Sir George Pollock was not consulted over the changes, he continued to present the medal in person whenever his health allowed him until 4 months before his death, when he presented it to John Copsey Addison in June 1872.

In 1861 the East India Company handed over control of its Indian possessions to the British government and the East India Company's military units were incorporated into the British army. The Military Seminary at Addiscombe was closed and the Royal Military Academy at Woolwich took over the training of new officers, and the awarding of the Pollock Medal.

With the outbreak of the Second World War, the training course ceased. In 1947 the Royal Military Academy at Woolwich and Royal Military College at Sandhurst were amalgamated to become the Royal Military Academy Sandhurst. Sandhurst now presents the top cadet with the Queen's Medal.

Holders 
The following is the roll of Pollock Medallists until February 1875 as recorded on tablets fixed on the walls of the great dining hall of the Royal Military Academy at Woolwich:

Awarded at Addiscombe

Awarded at Woolwich 

The above two lists are taken from the Memoir to Illustrate the Origin and Foundation of the Pollock Medal (1875), published anonymously but probably written by Field Marshal Sir Lintorn Simmons. Updated March 2016 by the son (see edit history for contact information) of the December 1928 recipient to include recipients after July 1875 using supplementary pages in his father's copy of the book. The following list was created from the RMAS Old College Notice Board. Note that in December 1925 there were two classes commissioned (Last of 4-term; first of 3-term.)

Notes

Decorations of the British Army
Awards established in 1848